Enatimene is a genus of sea snails, marine gastropod mollusks in the family Muricidae, the murex snails or rock snails.

Species
Species within the genus Enatimene include:

 Enatimene bassetti (Houart, 1998)
 Enatimene lanceolatus Houart, 2004
 Enatimene simplex (Hedley, 1903)

References

 
Gastropod genera